The album chart name changed from "Top Pop Albums" to "Billboard 200 Top Albums" on September 7, 1991.
The highest-selling albums and EPs in the United States are ranked in the Billboard 200, which is published by Billboard magazine. The data are compiled by Nielsen Soundscan starting with the week ending in May 25, 1991 based on each album's weekly physical and digital sales. In 1991, a total of 14 albums claimed the top of the chart. One of which, American rapper Vanilla Ice's To the Extreme started its peak on the issue dated November 10, 1990, and spent 8 weeks atop the chart in 1991. 

Mariah Carey's  self-titled debut album was the longest running number-one album of the year, spending 11 consecutive weeks atop the chart and was the best-selling album of 1991.

Chart history

See also
1991 in music
List of number-one albums (United States)

References

1991
1991 record charts